The 1948 Utah State Aggies football team was an American football team that represented Utah State Agricultural College in the Mountain States Conference (MSC) during the 1948 college football season. In their 29th season under head coach Dick Romney, the Aggies compiled a 5–6 record (2–3 against MSC opponents), finished fourth in the MSC, and were outscored by a total of 238 to 196.

Schedule

References

Utah State
Utah State Aggies football seasons
Utah State Aggies football